The Shenlan SL03 is a compact executive electric sedan produced by Chinese electric car company Changan Automobile under their premium NEV brand, Shenlan. Changan has jointly developed the Shenlan SL03 with Huawei and CATL.

Overview

The Shenlan SL03 liftback sedan is offered in three options, a standard electric vehicle, a series hybrid, and an electric vehicle with a hydrogen electrochemical generator. Changan claims that the SL03 has a sharp exterior design that allows for a drag coefficient of 0.230. With the energy consumption of the pure electric SL03 being 12.3 kWh/100 km.

The Shenlan SL03 is equipped with 27 different sensors and level-4 autonomous driving support. With a SA8155P Automotive Development Platform computer chip for computers from Qualcomm that power the autonomous driving systems.

References

Shenlan SL03
2020s cars
Cars of China
Cars introduced in 2022
Sports sedans
Production electric cars
Rear-wheel-drive vehicles
Hybrid electric cars
Vehicles codeveloped with Huawei